Michael Edmund Francis Dormer (22 April 1937 – 19 April 2021) was a New Zealand cricketer. A wicket-keeper, he played four first-class matches for Auckland in the 1961/62 season. 

Dormer was educated at Nelson College and the University of Auckland. He moved to Christchurch in the 1960s, working for the ANZ Bank and then for Independent Fisheries. He was also the representative for the Chilean Consul in New Zealand. He was the founder of the Willows Cricket Club and its ground in Loburn, North Canterbury.

See also
 List of Auckland representative cricketers

References

External links
 

1937 births
2021 deaths
People educated at Nelson College
University of Auckland alumni
New Zealand cricketers
Auckland cricketers
Cricketers from Lower Hutt